Daddy Plays the Horn is a 1955 jazz album by saxophonist Dexter Gordon.

Reception 

The Billboard review stated that the album was "not too original, but it swings" and mentioned that Gordon played "some top-flight, Lester Young-inspired tenor here, with a more robust sound than that of the master or most of his other disciples". The Penguin Guide to Jazz awarded it three out of four stars, saying "Daddy would be worth the purchase for 'Confirmation' and 'Autumn in New York'... Drew and Vinnegar play exceptionally well, and the CD transfer is generally good."

Track listing 
 "Daddy Plays the Horn" (9:11)
 "Confirmation" (7:50)
 "Darn That Dream" (4:21)
 "Number Four" (4:51)
 "Autumn in New York" (6:30)
 "You Can Depend on Me" (8:59)

Personnel 
 Dexter Gordon – tenor saxophone
 Kenny Drew – piano
 Leroy Vinnegar – bass
 Lawrence Marable – drums

In popular culture 
The album is mentioned several times in the novels The Talisman and Black House by Stephen King and Peter Straub.

References 

1955 albums
Dexter Gordon albums
Bethlehem Records albums
Albums produced by Ralph Bass